Crónica may refer to:
 Crónica (newspaper), a Buenos Aires newspaper
 Crónica Electrónica or Crónica, an independent media label based in Porto, Portugal
 Crónica TV, an Argentine news cable channel
Crônica, a Portuguese-language form of short writings about daily topics, published in newspaper or magazine columns

See also
La Crónica de Hoy, a Mexican newspaper
Chronic (disambiguation)
Chronicle (disambiguation)

it:Cronaca